Hamarskorvene Bluff is a rock and ice bluff just east of Kvithamaren Cliff in the Mühlig-Hofmann Mountains of Queen Maud Land, Antarctica. It was mapped and named by Norwegian cartographers from surveys and air photos by the Sixth Norwegian Antarctic Expedition (1956–60).

See also
Skorvebradden

References

Cliffs of Queen Maud Land
Princess Astrid Coast